Margot Wilhelmina ("Wilma") Teunisje van Velsen (born 22 April 1964 in Tiel, Gelderland) is a former butterfly and freestyle swimmer from The Netherlands, who twice competed for her country at the Summer Olympics, starting in 1980 in Moscow, Soviet Union. There she won the bronze medal in the 4×100 m freestyle relay, alongside Conny van Bentum, Annelies Maas and Reggie de Jong. Four years later in Los Angeles, United States she was a member of the silver winning team in the same event, although she just swam in the qualifying heats to bring The Netherlands to the final. There the team was made up by Conny van Bentum, Desi Reijers, Annemarie Verstappen, and Elles Voskes.

Between 1981 and 1983 van Velsen won three medals at European and world championships, also in the 4 × 100 m freestyle relay.

References

1964 births
Living people
Olympic swimmers of the Netherlands
Dutch female butterfly swimmers
Swimmers at the 1980 Summer Olympics
Swimmers at the 1984 Summer Olympics
Olympic silver medalists for the Netherlands
Olympic bronze medalists for the Netherlands
People from Tiel
Sportspeople from Gelderland
Olympic bronze medalists in swimming
Medalists at the 1980 Summer Olympics
Medalists at the 1984 Summer Olympics
Dutch female freestyle swimmers
World Aquatics Championships medalists in swimming
European Aquatics Championships medalists in swimming
Olympic silver medalists in swimming
20th-century Dutch women